Lofthouse-in-Nidderdale railway station was the northernmost regular passenger terminus on the Nidd Valley Light Railway (NVLR), in Lofthouse, then in the West Riding of Yorkshire and now in North Yorkshire, England. The station was built as part of Bradford Corporation's programme of reservoir building in the Upper Nidd Valley. The station opened in 1904 and was closed to passengers in 1930.  The station was renamed Lofthouse-in-Nidderdale railway station in 1907 to avoid confusion with Lofthouse and Outwood railway station, also in the West Riding of Yorkshire.

History
Lofthouse was the first station on the line to be used, as it was a transshipment point between road and rail for the  line from Lofthouse up the valley in connection with the building of the reservoirs.

The station was  up the valley from Pateley Bridge station, and was also a similar distance from Angram Reservoir, however Lofthouse served as the terminus of public passenger traffic. Lofthouse had its passenger service inaugurated on 12 September 1907, but a celebratory special working had traversed the line from Pateley Bridge to Lofthouse the day before. The station layout consisted of a single platform on the eastern side, with a passing loop for freight services. The station also had a goods shed and two sidings on the western side, next to the River Nidd. The Crown Inn public house, adjacent to what would become the station building, was extended in the early 1910s to become the station hotel.

The signalling was undertaken by a ground frame located on the single platform. Although Lofthouse was the terminus of the regular passenger line, passenger trains for those employed on the reservoir workings up valley (and their families) were laid on from Lofthouse.

The last NVLR passenger train from Pateley Bridge ran in December 1929, with official closure of the station to passengers on 1 January 1930, and to goods traffic at the end of March 1930. However, the line remained open for another seven years as freight traffic still ran up the valley to the reservoir construction sites. The railway building survives as a private residence, and the railway bridge to the immediate north of the station now functions as the main road bridge in the village across the River Nidd.

Notes

References

Sources

Disused railway stations in North Yorkshire
Railway stations in Great Britain opened in 1907
Railway stations in Great Britain closed in 1930
Nidderdale